The Sinfonietta (subtitled "Military Sinfonietta" or "Sokol Festival") from 1926 is a late work for large orchestra (of which 25 are brass players) by the Czech composer Leoš Janáček. It is dedicated "To the Czechoslovak Army" and Janáček said it was intended to express "contemporary free man, his spiritual beauty and joy, his strength, courage and determination to fight for victory". It started by Janáček listening to a brass band, becoming inspired to write some fanfares of his own. When the organisers of the Sokol Gymnastic Festival approached him for a commission, he developed the material into the Sinfonietta. He later dropped the word military. The first performance was in Prague on 26 June 1926 under Václav Talich.

The typical performance duration is 20–25 minutes.

Structure
Sinfonietta is typical of Janáček's tight construction in that the material of each movement derives from the opening motif. It features several variants based on Janáček's original fanfare.

The piece is in five movements, all of which have descriptive subtitles:

The first movement is scored only for brass and percussion. The second movement begins with a rapid ostinato from the wind but later has a more lyrical episode. The third begins quietly in the strings but is interrupted by a stern figure in the trombones, leading to another fast dance-like passage. In the fourth movement, Janáček celebrates the newly liberated Czechoslovakia with a joyous trumpet fanfare. The finale begins in the key of E minor with a calm retrograde version of the opening melody. However, this quickly moves into a triumphant finale, the return of the opening fanfare decorated with swirling figures in the strings and wind.

Instrumentation 
The score calls for the following orchestra with expanded brass section:

Woodwinds
Piccolo, alternating Flute 4.
3 Flutes
2 Oboes
English horn
Clarinet in E
2 Clarinets in B
Bass clarinet
2 Bassoons

Brass
4 Horns in F
9 Trumpets in C*
3 Trumpets in F
2 Bass trumpets*

4 Trombones
2 Euphoniums (as "Tenor Tubas")*
Tuba

Percussion2
Timpani
Cymbals
Chimes

Strings
Harp

Violins I, II
Violas
Violoncellos
Double basses

*) The nine C trumpets, the bass trumpets, and tenor tubas are heard only in the first and last movements.

Arrangements 
The work was transcribed for wind ensemble by Don Patterson in 1994 and by Merlin Patterson 1996, the latter being recorded by the University of Houston Wind Ensemble, conducted by Eddie Green, the following year. This work was also used by the progressive rock band "Emerson, Lake & Palmer" for their piece entitled "Knife-Edge".

 Arrangement suitable for: orchestra
 arrangement for: brass ensemble
 arrangement by: Rolf Smedwig
 performed by: Empire Brass
 Arrangement suitable for: orchestra
 arrangement for: brass band
 arrangement by: Steven Hamstra
 performed by: Brass Band De Wâldsang, conductor 
 Arrangement suitable for: orchestra
 arrangement for: brass sextet
 arrangement by: František Jílek
 performed by: Brno Czech Brass Sextet
 Arrangement suitable for: orchestra
 arrangement for: wind orchestra
 arrangement by: Karel Bělohoubek
 performed by: Czech Army Central Band, conductor Vladimír Válek
 Arrangement suitable for: orchestra
 arrangement for: wind orchestra
 arrangement by: Hynek Sluka
 performed by: Prague Castle Guard and Police Wind Orchestra, conductor Miroslav Hanzal
 Arrangement suitable for: orchestra
 arrangement for: wind ensemble
 arrangement by: Merlin Patterson
 performed by: University of Houston Wind Ensemble, conductor Eddie Green
 Arrangement suitable for: orchestra
 arrangement for: organ
 arrangement by: Josh Perschbacher
 performed by: org Josh Perschbacher
 Arrangement suitable for: orchestra
 arrangement for: symphonic wind band
 arrangement by: Simon Scheiwiller
 performed by: Banda Municipal de Barcelona, conductor Salvador Brotons

Selected recordings
 Břetislav Bakala/Czech Philharmonic: Supraphon 1203-V (1950)
 George Szell/Cleveland Orchestra: Sony 88697 58952 2
 Karel Ančerl/Czech Philharmonic: Supraphon 3684
 Simon Rattle/Philharmonia Orchestra: EMI 5-66980-2
 Sir Charles Mackerras/Vienna Philharmonic: London 410138-2
 André Previn/Los Angeles Philharmonic: Telarc CD-80174
 František Jílek/Brno Philharmonic: Supraphon 110282-2
 Libor Pešek/Philharmonia Orchestra: Virgin VC791506-2
 José Serebrier/Brno Philharmonic: Reference Recordings HCDC

Media

Appearances and references in other work
A rearrangement of the opening of the Sinfonietta was used by the progressive rock band Emerson, Lake & Palmer for their song "Knife-Edge" on their debut album.

The opening of the fourth movement (usually no more than about 40 seconds of it) was used as the theme tune for the UK Granada Television series Crown Court during the 1970s and 1980s, although it was never heard in full in any episode. It would be during this opening that the court reporter, Peter Wheeler, would, as a voice-over, either set the scene for the episode or else describe plot events that had occurred in previous episodes.

The third movement, Moderato (The Queen's Monastery), was the inspiration and soundtrack for the animated film The Queen's Monastery by Emma Calder.

Haruki Murakami's novel 1Q84 begins with the Sinfonietta playing on a taxi's radio. The work then appears several times later in the novel as a recurring theme connecting the two main characters. The popularity of the novel has led to an increase in sales of recordings of the Sinfonietta in Japan.

References

External links

 Janáček Sinfonietta 4th movement (YouTube)

Compositions by Leoš Janáček
Janáček
1926 compositions
Music dedicated to causes or groups